Puu Jih Shih Temple is a Buddhist temple located at the hilltop of Tanah Merah at Sandakan Bay in Sandakan, Sabah, Malaysia. The temple was built in 1987 and officiated by Joseph Pairin Kitingan, the Chief Minister of Sabah at the time. It is the largest Chinese temple for the town and situated around 4 kilometres west of the town centre.

The temple was featured in the American television series of The Amazing Race 4 in 2003.

Features 
The temple is located in a hilly area where visitors can view the Sandakan coast. Its surroundings within a forested areas is ablaze with dragon sculpture and gilded Buddhas.

References

External links 
 

Religious buildings and structures completed in 1987
Chinese-Malaysian culture
Buddhist temples in Malaysia
Taoist temples in Malaysia
Buildings and structures in Sandakan
Tourist attractions in Sabah
Guanyin temples
20th-century Buddhist temples
20th-century architecture in Malaysia